Bang is a Scandinavian surname as well as a Korean surname. The Scandinavian surname is derived from the Old Norse banga which means to pound or hammer. The Korean surname is cognate to the Chinese surname Fāng (方). Notable people with the surname include:

Bang (Scandinavian surname)
 Anton Christian Bang (born 1840), Norwegian politician
 Arne Bang-Hansen (1911–1990), Norwegian actor
 Bernhard Lauritz Frederik Bang, Danish scientist
 Betsy Bang (1912–2003), American biologist and medical/scientific illustrator
 Claes Bang (born 1967), Danish actor
 Elisabeth Bang (1922–2009), Norwegian actress
 Frederik Bang, American scientist, discoverer of Limulus amebocyte lysate (LAL)
 Herman Bang (1857–1912), Danish author
 Kjetil Bang-Hansen (born 1940), Norwegian actor 
 Molly Bang (born 1943), American illustrator
 Nina Bang (1866–1928), Danish politician
 Odd Bang-Hansen (1908–1984), Norwegian educator, journalist and author
 Otto T. Bang (1931–2008), American businessman and politician
 Pål Bang-Hansen (1937–2010), Norwegian actor
 Peter Bang (engineer) (1900–1957), Danish engineer and co-founder of Bang & Olufsen
 Peter Fibiger Bang (born 1973), Danish comparative historian
 Peter Georg Bang (1797–1861), Danish politician and jurist
 Thomas Bang (born 1938), Danish sculptor

Bang (Korean surname; Hangul : 방 / Hanja : 方/房)

 Andrea Bang, Canadian actress
 Diana Bang, Korean Canadian actress, writer and producer
 Sung Hoon (born as Bang In-kyu), South Korean actor and model
 Go Eun-ah (born as Bang Hyo-jin), South Korean actress
 Minah (born as Bang Minah), South Korean singer and member of girl group Girl's Day
 Mir (singer) (born as Bang Cheol-yong), South Korean singer and member of boy band MBLAQ
 Ryan Bang, South Korean actor, singer and entertainer in the Philippines
 Bang Jae-min, South Korean actor and rapper
 Bang Seong-joon, South Korean voice actor
 Bang Sung-hyeon (better known as JJonak), competitive Overwatch player
 Bang Si-hyuk, South Korean lyricist, composer, producer, and record executive, founder of Big Hit Music and Hybe Corporation
 Bang Ye-dam, South Korean singer and former member of boy band Treasure
 Bang Yong-guk, South Korean rapper, songwriter and leader of boy band B.A.P
 Bang Young-ung, South Korean novelist

See also
Bangs (surname)

Danish-language surnames
Korean-language surnames
Norwegian-language surnames